Expander graph
Homeomorphism (graph theory)